The English Women's Volleyball League is the major volleyball national competition for women in England, established in 1977. It is organised by the English Volleyball Association (EVA).

Formula of the competition
In the season 2018/19 the championship was held in two stages. On the first 9 teams played in one round, on the second – the best 5 teams played in two more rounds (all results of the first stage were taken into account).

For the victory with the score 3:0 and 3:1 the teams get 3 points, 3:2 – 2 points, for the defeat with the score 2:3 – 1 point, 0:3 and 1:3 – 0 points.

In the 2018/19 season in the Super League 9 teams had participated : "Tendering Ladies (Cluckton-on-Cy), Durham Palatines (Durham), London Orcas (London), Wessex (Bournemouth), Malory Eagles (London), Sheffield Holham (Sheffield), Polonia London (London), Bristol, Birmingham. The champion title won by the Tendering Ladies. 2nd place went to Durham Palatineights, London Orcas Finished Third.

Winners list

References

External links
The English Volleyball Association 
  UK Superleague. women.volleybox.net 

England
Volleyball in England
England Women's Volleyball League
Professional sports leagues in the United Kingdom